The 2020–21 Croatian Second Football League (also known as Druga HNL and 2. HNL) was the 30th season of the Croatian Second Football League, the second-level football competition for men's association football teams in Croatia, since its establishment in 1992. The season started on 13 August 2020 and ended on 29 May 2021.

The league was contested by 18 teams, two more than the previous season, and played in a double round robin format, with each team playing every other team twice over 34 rounds.

Teams
On 20 May 2020, Croatian Football Federation announced that the first stage of licensing procedure for 2020–21 season was complete. For the 2020–21 Druga HNL, a total of 17 clubs were issued a second level license. In the second stage of licensing procedure clubs that were not licensed in the first round appealed the decision. On 17 June 2020, Croatian Football Federation announced that the licensing procedure for 2020–21 season was complete.

Stadia and locations

Number of teams by county

League table

Results

Statistics

Top goalscorers

See also
2020–21 Croatian First Football League

References

External links
Official website  

2020-21
Cro
2